Era. Anbarasu (20 October 1940 – 8 August 2019) was an Indian politician who served as Member of Parliament elected from Tamil Nadu. He was elected to the Lok Sabha as an Indian National Congress candidate from Central Chennai constituency in 1989 and 1991 elections. He was elected as an Indian National Congress (Indira) candidate from Chengalpattu constituency in 1980 election.

His son, D. Arul Anbarasu, was a member of Indian National Congress  and the MLA for Sholinghur constituency.

References 

Indian National Congress politicians from Tamil Nadu
1940 births
2019 deaths
India MPs 1980–1984
India MPs 1989–1991
India MPs 1991–1996
Lok Sabha members from Tamil Nadu
People from Kanchipuram district
Politicians from Chennai